Unfinished Business is a 1941 American romantic comedy film produced and directed by Gregory La Cava and starring Irene Dunne, Robert Montgomery and Preston Foster. The screenplay concerns a young woman who quickly falls in love with a playboy, but when he shows no interest in making her his wife, marries his brother.

Plot
On a train to New York City, small-town singer Nancy Andrews meets a sophisticated playboy, Steve Duncan, and quickly falls head over heels in love. Steve barely gives her a second look once they reach their destination.

Rejected during an audition for the opera, Nancy has to settle for a job as a telephone operator, doing singing telegrams. Nightclub impresario Billy Ross likes her voice and offers her a job. At the club, attorney Tommy Duncan, brother of Steve, gets drunk. When a heartbroken Nancy learns that Steve is about to marry another woman, Tommy gets her tipsy and elopes to a South Carolina justice of the peace with her to be married.

Next day, Tommy finds to his surprise that he is in love with Nancy, but it is not mutual. After they return to New York and throw a party, Nancy kisses Steve, to the consternation of Steve's new wife Sheila as well as Tommy's old girlfriend Clarisse.

A disappointed Tommy enlists in the Army and leaves for a year. Upon returning, he punches his brother and prepares to grant Nancy her divorce. That's when he learns that he and Nancy are parents of a baby boy, and that she is overjoyed to know that Tommy still loves her.

Cast

Reception
Bosley Crowther gave the film a decidedly mixed review in The New York Times, praising Dunne, Montgomery and "a good cast", as well as director La Cava, but felt they were not quite able to save "a foolish script with glib action".

References

External links

1941 films
1941 romantic comedy films
American black-and-white films
American romantic comedy films
Films directed by Gregory La Cava
Universal Pictures films
1940s American films